Marcos Ferreira Xavier (born 18 February 1982) is a Brazilian-Azerbaijani football midfielder whose last known club was São Gonçalo in the Campeonato Carioca Third Division.

Career
Marcos transferred to FK Karvan from Corinthians Alagoano in summer 2005. In the 2007 winter transfer window Marcos moved to Neftchi Baku on loan till the end of the season.

International career
After taking Azerbaijani citizenship in 2007, Marcos made his debut for Azerbaijan on 7 March 2007 in a 1–0 victory over Uzbekistan in the Alma TV Cup. His second, and last appearance for Azerbaijan, came four days later against Kyrgyzstan, also in the Alma TV Cup.

Career statistics

References

External links

Player profile
Brazilian FA Database 

1982 births
Living people
Footballers from Rio de Janeiro (city)
Naturalized citizens of Azerbaijan
Azerbaijani footballers
Azerbaijan international footballers
Association football midfielders
Brazilian emigrants to Azerbaijan
Azerbaijan Premier League players
Neftçi PFK players